That Night (originally titled One Hot Summer) is a 1992 American coming-of-age romantic drama film written and directed by Craig Bolotin and starring C. Thomas Howell and Juliette Lewis. It is based on the 1987 novel of the same name by Alice McDermott.

This film marks the film debut of both Eliza Dushku and Katherine Heigl.

Plot 
In 1961 Long Island, Alice Bloom is a ten-year-old girl who is trying to understand how love works. She is infatuated with the girl across the street, 17-year-old Sheryl O' Connor. She often looks at her from her bedroom window.  Alice starts to copy every detail about Sheryl, including her perfume and even the record she listens to.  She admires the affection that Sheryl's father gives her, as she doesn't receive the same from her own father.  She then tells her mother about how amazing Sheryl is but Alice's mother pays little attention.

One day she goes bowling with some of her friends and is ridiculed by them. Reeling from comments made to her, she immediately becomes excited when Sheryl walks into the bowling alley along with a group of guys trying to win her affection. Sheryl, seemingly innocent and moral, rejects their advances. Sheryl meets the counter boy Rick, and they are instantly attracted to one another. As Alice continues to bowl with her friends, she constantly watches Sheryl's every move. Her friends doubt she even knows Sheryl. Rick pages Sheryl to come back to the desk, and a police officer tells her that her father just died.

During the funeral, Sheryl is obviously upset. Afterwards she returns her bowling shoes to the bowling alley. Rick tells her they are closed, and she starts crying over her father. After some conversation, Rick walks Sheryl home, and this leads to their first kiss which is seen by Alice. The next day Rick comes back with his gang, and they take Sheryl to the beach, where they have oysters and tequila and Sheryl pours her heart out over her father's death. They spend the whole day and night together.

All is not well, however.  Sheryl's mother disapproves of the relationship between her and Rick.  Eventually, she bars her from seeing him, and the neighborhood begins to gossip.  Sheryl refuses to listen to her mother.  Sheryl babysits Alice and a friendship begins with Sheryl imparting wisdom about boys.  Alice offers help to Sheryl to sneak out and see Rick.  The three of them spend much of the night together which includes bringing Alice to seedy places like dive bars and under the boardwalk.  She also makes a record in a booth detailing everything that happened that night.

Alice continues to help Sheryl and Rick hide their relationship.  She goes to the bowling alley to explain to Rick why Sheryl couldn't see him one day.  Alice's father tells her to stay away from the older Rick.  It's revealed that Sheryl is pregnant.  Her mother decides to send her to an unwed mother's home 300 miles away.  Rick repeatedly calls Sheryl's house only to have her mother tell him not to call. Finally, he and his gang drive to her house where Rick pleads to speak to Sheryl.  This captures the attention of most of the immediate neighbors.  Her mother informs him that Sheryl is gone and he is to leave.  He refuses to believe her and pushes her aside to go into the house.  The neighborhood fathers then rush to help Ann, and a brawl ensues between Rick's gang and the neighbors.  Rick spends a week in jail and it's assumed that no serious charges were filed.

Alice becomes withdrawn from the incident and she decides to run away.  Rick finds her under the boardwalk and the two talk.  Reluctantly, Rick agrees to drive upstate with Alice to meet Sheryl at the unwed mother's home.  Alice arranges for Sheryl to sneak out at midnight to meet Rick at the restaurant.

The couple meet but Sheryl has decided that she wants to put the baby up for adoption.  She realistically can't see a life with Rick and a baby. They have no money or viable jobs.  Rick is upset and hands her an engagement ring that he suggests she pawn.  Alice then talks to Sheryl and asks her what happened to true love.  Sheryl tells her that she is simply too young to understand.  Alice still wants the three of them to run away together.  Sheryl tells Alice that she can't leave her family.  As Alice is put on a bus back to Long Island, she stares out the window as Rick and Sheryl embrace.

Alice makes it home, and her parents are relieved to have her back.  She states that despite the gossip about Sheryl, she received a postcard telling her the truth: Sheryl and Rick were well on their way to the west coast and they were doing well.  Alice then reveals that she learned some things that summer that she would never forget.

Cast 
 C. Thomas Howell as Rick
 Juliette Lewis as Sheryl O'Connor
 Helen Shaver as Ann O'Connor
 Eliza Dushku as Alice Bloom
 John Dossett as Larry Bloom
 J. Smith-Cameron as Carol Bloom
 Katherine Heigl as Kathryn
 Adam LeFevre as Mr. Carpenter

Production 
Filming began in Baltimore County in September 1991. It was also shot in Pennsylvania and New Jersey.

Reception 
The film holds a rating of 67% on Rotten Tomatoes based on 6 reviews. Among critical reviews, the performances by Dushku and Lewis were praised.

David Stratton of Variety wrote "This isn't exactly riveting material, and the film's modest production values seem more suited to the small screen. Nevertheless, [Dushku] makes the hero-worshiping moppet an engaging character, and Howell is just right as every suburban mom's idea of a daughter's undesirable boyfriend. Lewis, her hair dyed blond, is more than adequate as the vivacious Sheryl."

Janet Maslin of The New York Times expressed disappointment in the number and depth of changes made in the film, and found Lewis' "slinky, demonstrative performance is way out of proportion to the tepid film built around it." Entertainment Weekly graded the film "B−", remarking that director Bolotin "leans too heavily on period detail, but That Night clicks whenever it taps into the crazy, stupid madness of teen lust." Peter Travers of Rolling Stone wrote that while book author McDermott made clear how the intensity of the teen romance changes Alice's life, first-time director Bolotin offers a "pale facsimile that traffics in too many coming-of-age clichés", but concluded, "what makes That Night worth seeing is a knockout performance from Lewis, who evokes the joy and confusion of sexuality. You can't take your eyes off her."

Home media
That Night was originally available on VHS via Warner Home Video in the United States on January 31, 1995,
and the United Kingdom, where it was released on February 6, 1995.

The film was released on DVD in the U.S. (Region 1) on March 6, 2016 from 20th Century Fox Home Entertainment. The remastered set is available in its original aspect ratio of 1.85:1 and includes a digital copy.

References

External links 
 
 
 

1992 films
1990s coming-of-age drama films
1992 romantic drama films
1990s teen drama films
American coming-of-age drama films
American romantic drama films
American teen drama films
Films scored by David Newman
Films about friendship
Films about puberty
Films based on American novels
Films based on romance novels
Films set in the 1960s
Films set in 1961
Films shot in Maryland
Long Island in fiction
Regency Enterprises films
StudioCanal films
Teenage pregnancy in film
1992 directorial debut films
1990s English-language films
1990s female buddy films
Films produced by Arnon Milchan
1990s American films